KAAT (103.1 MHz) is an FM radio station broadcasting a Regional Mexican format. The station is licensed to Oakhurst, California and serves the Fresno area. KAAT also has an FM booster in Merced, California, with the call sign KAAT-FM1. The station is currently owned by Lazer Broadcasting Corporation.

References

External links

AAT
AAT